Suzaku, Su-zaku, or Su-Zaku may refer to:
 Vermilion Bird (Zhū Què), whose Japanese name is Suzaku, the bird guardian of the South and one of the Four Symbols of Chinese constellations
 Suzaku (film), a 1997 Japanese film by Naomi Kawase
 Emperor Suzaku (922–952), an emperor of Japan
 Emperor Go-Suzaku (1009–1045), an emperor of Japan
 SUZAK Inc., also known as Suzaku, a video game developer
 Suzaku Avenue, one of the ancient main streets in Kyoto and Nara, Japan
 Suzaku (satellite), the name given in 2005 to an ASTRO-EII spacecraft, a joint venture of NASA and the Japanese Space Agency JAXA

Fiction
 Suzaku (YuYu Hakusho), a character in YuYu Hakusho media
 Suzaku Kururugi, a character in the anime series Code Geass: Lelouch of the Rebellion
 Suzaku, an enemy in the PlayStation game SaGa Frontier
 Suzaku, a character in Descendants of Darkness (Yami no Matsuei) who is one of Tsuzuki's shikigami, or guardian beasts
 Suzaku, a character in the game Flying Dragon
 Suzaku Seikun, a god-character in Fushigi Yûgi
 Suzaku, the bitbeast companion of Kai Hiwatari in the Beyblade franchise
 Suzaku, an antagonist of the game Tenchu 2: Birth of the Stealth Assassins
 Suzaku, the 23rd rank in the video game Tekken Tag Tournament 2
 Ryu Suzaku, the protagonist of the anime series F-Zero: Legend of the Falcon (F-Zero GP Legend), known in English as Rick Wheeler
 Su-Zaku, an enemy in the Game Boy game The Final Fantasy Legend
 Suzaku, the guardian of the South Gate of The Imperial Palace in Accel World
 Suzaku, one of the guardian spirits in the video game Nioh.
 Suzaku, one of the Four Lords in the video game Final Fantasy XIV: Stormblood

See also
 Shūsaku, a Japanese given name
 Suzuka (disambiguation)

Japanese masculine given names